Eukaryotic translation initiation factor 3 subunit G (eIF3g) is a protein that in humans is encoded by the EIF3G gene.

Interactions 

EIF3G has been shown to interact with Band 4.1, EIF3C and EIF3A.

See also 
Eukaryotic initiation factor 3 (eIF3)

References

Further reading